Willi Bredel (2 May 1901 in Hamburg – 27 October 1964 in East Berlin) was a German writer and president of the DDR Academy of Arts, Berlin.  Born in Hamburg, he was a pioneer of socialist realist literature.

Life and career
Born in to the family of a cigar maker, after graduating from primary school he became a metal worker. From 1916 to 1917 he was a member of the Socialist Workers' Youth, from 1917 to 1920 of the Spartakusbund and from 1919 of the Communist Party of Germany. In 1923 he took part in the Hamburg Uprising and was sentenced to two years in prison. After his amnesty in 1925, he worked as a lathe operator in the Kampnagel factory while being the editor of various communist news outlets. Due to "Preparing literary treason and high treason", he was in 1930 sentence to two years imprisonment. He wrote his first novels while in custody.   

Soon after the Nazis seized power in 1933, Bredel was imprisoned at Fuhlsbüttel concentration camp. He was released in spring 1934. Fleeing from Nazi Germany, he went to Czechoslovakia and then Moscow, where he lived at the Hotel Lux. He published Die Prüfung (1934), a novel describing the Nazi concentration camp, which was reprinted several times and translated into other languages. He also published accounts of his experiences in the Deutsche Zentral Zeitung, a German-language newspaper published in Moscow.

Bredel took part in the Spanish Civil War as commissar of the Thälmann Battalion as well as the Second World War, in which he fought on the Soviet side.

His propaganda material, along with those of Walter Ulbricht and Erich Weinert was used in an attempt to lure the 6th Army into surrendering at the Battle of Stalingrad.

After the war, he returned to Germany as part of the Sobottka Group, sent to lay the groundwork for the Soviet occupation of Mecklenburg. He later lived in East Germany and died in East Berlin.

Awards and decorations
 1955 Patriotic Order of Merit in silver
 1956 Hans Beimler Medal
 1960 Banner of Labor
 1961 Patriotic Order of Merit in gold
 1964 Burial at the Memorial of the Socialists (Friedrichsfelde Central Cemetery)

Selected works
 Die Prüfung
 The Death of General Moreau and other stories
 Verwandte und Bekannte Trilogy

See also 
 List of German veterans of the International Brigades

References

External links
 Willi Bredel Gesellschaft Official website 

1901 births
1964 deaths
Writers from Hamburg
Communist Party of Germany politicians
Socialist Unity Party of Germany politicians
Members of the Provisional Volkskammer
Cultural Association of the GDR members
East German writers
20th-century German novelists
German Anti-Francoists
German male novelists
Refugees from Nazi Germany in the Soviet Union
International Brigades personnel
German people of the Spanish Civil War
German people of World War II
Nazi concentration camp survivors
National Committee for a Free Germany members
Recipients of the National Prize of East Germany
Recipients of the Patriotic Order of Merit in gold
Recipients of the Banner of Labor
Communist writers
Socialist realism writers